The Heart Specialist is a 2006 American romantic comedy-drama film written, produced and directed by Dennis Cooper, and starring Wood Harris, Zoe Saldana, Brian J. White and Mýa. Originally released under the title Ways of the Flesh, the film premiered at the 2006 Boston Film Festival and remained unreleased until 2011, when it was granted a limited theatrical release by Freestyle Releasing.

Plot
A modern comedy about the everyday perils of first year medical residents at a shabby south Florida hospital. Wood Harris is the Chief Resident, who teaches the trainees how to save lives and not take themselves too seriously, all the while hiding a chilling secret of his own.

Cast
 Wood Harris as Dr. Sidney Zachary
 Zoe Saldana as Donna Chaisson
 Brian J. White as Dr. Ray Howard 
 Mýa as Valerie
 Scott Paulin as Dr. Graves
 David S. Lee as Dr. Propper
 Kenneth Choi as Mitchell Kwan
 Marla Gibbs as Mrs. Underwood
 Jenifer Lewis as Nurse Jackson
 Method Man as Lorenzo Chaisson
 Leon as Dr. Lee
 Jasmine Guy as Aunt Burnetta
 Terrence J as Jenks
 Ed Asner as Mr. Olson
 Thomas "Nephew Tommy" Miles as Curtis Underwood

Reception
The Heart Specialist ranked premiered nineteenth at the box office grossing $581,516 over the four-day Martin Luther King Jr. holiday weekend.

References

External links
 
 
 
 

2006 films
2006 romantic comedy-drama films
American romantic comedy-drama films
Films shot in Florida
Films shot in Los Angeles
2006 comedy films
2006 drama films
2000s English-language films
2000s American films